Jack Hannaway (22 October 1927 – 2 July 2007) was an English footballer who played as a wing half or full back. He made more than 250 Football League appearances for Manchester City, Gillingham and Southport in an eleven-year professional career.

References

1927 births
2007 deaths
Sportspeople from Bootle
English footballers
Association football wing halves
Association football fullbacks
Gillingham F.C. players
Manchester City F.C. players
Southport F.C. players
Lancaster City F.C. players
English Football League players